The Revolutionary Nationalist Groups (GNR) were a French far-right organization which gathered the nationalist revolutionary tendency between 1976 and 1978.

Founded by François Duprat and his friend, Alain Renault, they structured the radical tendency of the National Front (FN) after the rallying to the FN of the Fédération d'Action Nationale et Européenne (FANE) in 1974.

The GNR's newspaper 

The GNR's existence was at first restricted to the Cahiers européens, a magazine launched in the frame of the New European Order, a neo-fascist Europe-wide alliance. Mark Fredriksen, leader of the Fédération d'action nationale et européenne (FANE), who was breaking with the New European Order, became co-director of the Cahiers européens-Notre Europe until May 1975.

The radical tendency of the National Front 

Jean-Marie Le Pen called for GNR members to take membership in the National Front in June 1974. The GNR disappeared following the assassination of Duprat on March 18, 1978. GNR activists broke the same year with the FN, joined with parts of the FN (in particular Michel Faci "Leloup", former member of the Front national de la jeunesse, FNJ, the youth organization of the FN, and current member of the French and European Nationalist Party).

See also 
History of far-right movements in France

References 

Fascist parties in France
French nationalism
Neo-fascist organizations
Third Position